Marie Lucas may refer to:
 Marie B. Lucas, African American physician
 Marie Seymour Lucas, French-born English painter